Lokesh Ohri is an Indian anthropologist, historian, writer and a cultural activist based in Dehradun, Uttarakhand, who has campaigned for the preservation of the natural and cultural heritage of the Doon Valley. He is the founder of Been There Doon That, an educational initiative that spreads awareness about the natural, social and cultural history of the Doon Valley through walks, lectures and workshops. He is a convener for the Dehradun chapter of the Indian National Trust for Art and Cultural Heritage.

Biography
Ohri was born in Dehradun and attended St Joseph's Academy and has a master's degree in sociology. He received his PhD in cultural anthropology from the University of Heidelberg. Ohri has long campaigned against insensitive and rapid development in Uttarakhand, particularly in the state capital Dehradun, which has led to a reduction in green cover of the state, partial or complete loss of heritage canals and water bodies through pollution or road construction, and poor restoration work on historic monuments. In 2013, he founded Been There Doon That, an initiative that highlights the cultural, natural and social heritage of the Doon Valley through public lectures, talks and heritage walks.

Books

References

External links
Official website - Been There Doon That

Living people
21st-century anthropologists
Heidelberg University alumni
People from Dehradun
Indian anthropologists
21st-century Indian historians
21st-century Indian writers
Indian conservationists
Conservator-restorers
Year of birth missing (living people)